Christopher McKitterick (born 1967) is an American writer of science fiction, educator, and academic concerned with the field. He is director of the Ad Astra Institute for Science Fiction & the Imagination, staff of the University of Kansas Achievement & Assessment Institute, director of the Ad Astra Center for Science Fiction and the Speculative Imagination, and was the long-time director of James E. Gunn's original Center for the Study of Science Fiction, serving the organization from 1992 until 2022. These programs support lectures, classes, master classes, workshops, awards, conferences, and educational-outreach resources for teachers, writers, and readers of science fiction.

McKitterick was nominations director for the Theodore Sturgeon Award for the best short SF story of the year (1993-2016), and a juror for and Chair of the John W. Campbell Memorial Award for Best Science Fiction Novel (2002–present).

He completed degrees in creative writing: undergraduate from the University of Wisconsin–Eau Claire in 1991, and master's from the University of Kansas in 1996.

McKitterick has taught science fiction, technical communication, and creative writing at the University of Kansas, and teaches science fiction literature and fiction-writing workshops around the world.

Bibliography

Novels
 Transcendence (Hadley Rille Books, November 5, 2010)

Short fiction
 "Ashes of Exploding Suns, Monuments to Dust" (Analog, November/December 2018) - Winner: 2018 Analytical Laboratory (AnLab) Readers' Award for best novelette.
"Waking the Predator" (The Hanging Garden: where fiction grows, July 19, 2016)
"Orpheus' Engines" (Mission Tomorrow: A New Century Of Exploration, Baen Books, October 2015)
"The Recursive Man" (Aftermaths, Hadley Rille Books, April 2012)
"Surveyor of Mars" (Westward Weird, DAW Books, February 2012)
 "The Enlightenment" (Sentinels: In Honor of Arthur C. Clarke, Hadley Rille Books, 2010)
 "The Empty Utopia" (Ruins: Extraterrestrial, Hadley Rille Books, 2007)
 "Jupiter Whispers" (Visual Journeys: A Tribute to Space Art, Hadley Rille Books, 2007)
 "The Enlightenment" (Synergy: New Science Fiction, Five Star Books, 2004)
 "Lost Dogs" (Analog, September 2001)
 "The Web" (Artemis Magazine for Artemis Project, Summer 2000)
 "City of Tomorrow" (Captain Proton, (a Star Trek book), Pocket Books, November 1999)
 "Under Observation" (Captain Proton, (a Star Trek book), Pocket Books, November 1999)
 "Worlds of Tomorrow" (Captain Proton, (a Star Trek book), Pocket Books, November 1999)
 "What Lurks in a Man's Mind" (Analog, October 1999)
 "Circles of Light and Shadow" (Analog,  February 1999)
 "A Scientist's War" (E-Scape, December 1998)
 "A Plague of Mannequins" (E-Scape, October 1996)
 "The Recursive Man" (Tomorrow Speculative Fiction, April 1996)
 "Paving the Road to Armageddon" (Analog, May 1995)

Editing
 "International Science Fiction" issue and companion website, (World Literature Today, May/June 2010)
 National Space Society Return to Luna anthology, Hadley Rille Books, December 5, 2008 (editorial juror)

Other published works
 Essay, "Literal Metaphors, Science Fiction, and How to Save the Human Species" (Astounding Analog Companion, December 17, 2018)
Biographical Essay, "James Gunn: Science Fiction's Dad" (introduction to Saving the World Through Science Fiction: James Gunn, Writer, Teacher and Scholar, McFarland, 2017)
Biographical Essay, "Frederik Pohl: Mr. Science Fiction (A Love Story)" (Foundation: The International Review of Science Fiction, issue 117, Spring-Summer 2014).
Essay, "Neptune, Triton, and the Sensawunda; or Why I Set My Novel (Partly) at the Edge of the Solar System" (Argentus: The Neptunian Anniversary, July 12, 2011)
Biographical Essay, "James Gunn: Science Fiction's Mentor" (2013 WorldCon Souvenir Book, September 2013)
Biographical Essay, "James Gunn: The Man Who Taught Us All Science Fiction" (James Gunn's Ad Astra #2, July 2013)
Article, "Science Fiction Studies at the University of Kansas" (SFRA Review, Number 305 Summer 2013)
Essay, "James Gunn: Inspiring the Future" (LoneStarCon3 Progress Report 4, August 2013)
Biographical Essay, "John W. Campbell: The Man Who Invented Modern Fantasy and the Golden Age of Science Fiction" (Argentus 11, 14 November 2011)
Essay, "James Gunn and the Center for the Study of Science Fiction" (Sense of Wonder: A Century of Science Fiction, June 1, 2011)
Essay, "Privacy, freedom, and making a living as a writer" (SFWA website, November 26, 2010)
 Essay, "Science Fiction: Stories for a Changing World" (Libraries Unlimited, July 2010)
 Essay, "Science Fiction Research Collections at the University of Kansas" (Science Fiction Studies, July 2010)
 Essay, "12 Don’t-Miss Speculative Fiction Events" (World Literature Today, May/June 2010)
 Essay, "Essential Science Fiction Anthologies" (World Literature Today, May/June 2010)
 Essay, "Science Fiction on the Web" (World Literature Today, May/June 2010)
 Essay, "The Literature of Change" (World Literature Today, May/June 2010)
 "Online Reference to a Basic Science Fiction Library" (with James Gunn) (World Literature Today, May/June 2010)
 "Online Reference to Speculative Fiction Events" (World Literature Today, May/June 2010)
 "Online Reference to Science Fiction on the Web" (World Literature Today, May/June 2010)
 "Online Reference to Teaching and Scholarly Resources on the Web" (World Literature Today, May/June 2010)
 Article, "Science Fiction" (with James Gunn) (Post-War Literature, 1945-1970 of Resource Guide to American Literature, Bruccoli Clark Layman, June 2010)
 Article, "The Joy Of Small Cons: Campbell Conference 2009" (Abyss & Apex Magazine, Issue 32: 4th Quarter 2009)
 Report, "Combined SFRA and Campbell Conference" (Locus magazine, September 2008)
 Report, "Robert A. Heinlein Centennial" (Locus magazine, September 2007)
 Essay, "Toto, We're in Kansas after All: The 2003 Campbell & Sturgeon Awards" (The New York Review of Science Fiction, Dragon Press, August 2003)
 Essay, "A Call to Arms" (Analog, January 1996)
 Role-Playing Adventure, Scarlet Brotherhood Mission Brief (TSR, Inc., 1999)
 Role-Playing Adventure, Return of the Pick Axe (TSR, Inc., 1998)
 Role-Playing Adventure, "Return of the Pick Axe" (TSR Jams, 1999)
 Essay, "James Gunn" (Twentieth-Century Science-Fiction Writers, Fourth Edition, St. James Press, 1996)
 Essay, "James Gunn and The Dreamers: Epitomes of an Evolving Science Fiction" (Extrapolation, Magazine of the Science Fiction Research Association, Winter 1995)

References

External links
 
 Ad Astra Institute for Science Fiction & the Speculative Imagination
 Ad Astra Center for Science Fiction and the Speculative Imagination
 About Christopher McKitterick, J Wayne and Elsie M Gunn Center for the Study of Science Fiction Director

21st-century American novelists
American male novelists
American science fiction writers
1967 births
Living people
University of Wisconsin–Eau Claire alumni
University of Kansas alumni
University of Kansas faculty
American male short story writers
21st-century American short story writers
21st-century American male writers